This article is about the Iran Baseball Championship.

2006
See footnote

2010 
Champion: Boushehr
Runner-up: Qom
3rd place: Semnan

Group A
Boushehr
Qom
Khorasan Razavi
Isfahan
Markazi

Group B
Alborz
Kerman
Semnan
Gilan
Hormozgan

See also
Baseball Federation of the Islamic Republic of Iran
Baseball awards#Iran

Footnotes

Baseball leagues in Asia
Baseball in Iran